Events from the year 1703 in literature.

Events
July 29–31 – Daniel Defoe is pilloried at Temple Bar, London, as part of a sentence for seditious libel, after publishing his satirical pamphlet The Shortest Way with the Dissenters (1702). He is released from Newgate Prison in mid-November.
unknown date – Richard Mead is appointed physician at St Thomas's Hospital, London.

New books

Prose
Joseph Addison – A Letter from Italy
Abel Boyer – The History of the Reign of Queen Anne
Gilbert Burnet – A Third Collection of Several Tracts and Discourses
Edmund Calamy – A Defence of Moderate Non-Conformity
Jeremy Collier – Mr Collier's Dissuasive from the Play-House
William Dampier – A Voyage to New Holland, &c. in the Year 1699
Daniel Defoe
A Brief Explanation of a Late Pamphlet, entitled, The Shortest Way with the Dissenters
A Dialogue Between a Dissenter and the Observator
A Hymn to the Funeral Sermon
Hymn to the Pillory
More Reformation: A satyr upon himself
The Shortest Way to Peace and Union
A True Collection of the Writings of the Author of the True-Born English-man
John Dunton – The Shortest Way with Whores and Rogues (satire on Defoe)
Thomas Hearne – Reliquiae Bodleianae
George Hickes – Linguarum veterum septentrionalium thesaurus grammatico-criticus et archæologicus
Benjamin Hoadly – The Reasonableness of Conformity to the Church of England
Louis-Armand de Lom d'Arce de Lahontan, Baron de Lahontan – New Voyages to North America
Bernard de Mandeville – Some Fables After the Easie and Familiar Method of Monsieur de la Fontaine
Leonty Magnitsky – Arithmetic (Арифметика)
Henry Maundrell – A Journey from Aleppo to Jerusalem at Easter A.D. 1697
Ned Ward – The Secret History of the Calves-head Clubb (against Republicanism)
Benjamin Whichcote – Moral and Religious Aphorisms

Drama
Thomas Baker – Tunbridge Walks
 Charles Boyle – As You Find It
Marie-Anne Barbier – Cornélie, mère des Gracques
William Burnaby – Love Betrayed
Susanna Centlivre –  Love's Contrivance
Chikamatsu Monzaemon – The Love Suicides at Sonezaki (曾根崎心中, Sonezaki Shinjū)
Thomas d'Urfey – The Old Mode and the New
Richard Estcourt – The Fair Example
Charles Gildon – The Patriot (adapted by Nathaniel Lee)
John Oldmixon – The Governour of Cyprus
Mary Pix – The Different Widows
Nicholas Rowe – The Fair Penitent (published)
Richard Steele – The Lying Lover
 William Walker – Marry, or Do Worse
 Richard Wilkinson – Vice Reclaimed

Poetry
Lady Mary Chudleigh – Poems on Several Occasions
William Congreve
A Hymn to Harmony
The Tears of Amaryllis for Amyntas
Sarah Fyge Egerton – Poems on Several Occasions
Pavao Ritter Vitezović – Plorantis Croatiae saecula duo (Two centuries of Croatia in mourning)
See also 1703 in poetry

Births
March 23 – Cajsa Warg, Swedish cookbook author (died 1769)
May 18 – İbrahim Hakkı Erzurumi, Turkish Sufi philosopher (died 1780)
June 28 – John Wesley, English writer of sermons and hymns (died 1791)
October 5 – Jonathan Edwards, American theologian (died 1758)
November 26 – Theophilus Cibber, English playwright (died 1758)
unknown dates
Henry Brooke, Irish novelist and dramatist (died 1783)
Charles Clémencet, French historian (died 1778)
Thomas Cooke, English writer and translator (died 1756)
John Ranby, English surgeon and writer on surgery (died 1773)
Ando Shoeki (安藤 昌益), Japanese philosopher (died 1762)
Gilbert West, English poet and translator (died 1756)

Deaths
January 11 – Johann Georg Graevius, German critic (born 1632)
February 17 – Philippe Goibaud-Dubois, French translator (born 1626)
March 3 – Robert Hooke, English natural philosopher (born 1635)
March 5 – Gabrielle Suchon, French moral philosopher (born 1631)
April 20 – Lancelot Addison, English writer and cleric (born 1632)
May 8 – Vincent Alsop, English religious writer and wit (born c. 1630)
May 16 – Charles Perrault, French writer of fairy tales (born 1628)
May 26 – Samuel Pepys, English diarist (born 1633)
August 21 – Thomas Tryon, English self-help author (born 1634)
September 29 – Charles de Saint-Évremond, French essayist and literary critic (born 1631)
unknown date – Samuel Johnson, English pamphleteer (born 1649)

References

 
Years of the 18th century in literature